Tribute This! is a 2008 documentary film directed by Mick McCleery and produced by Gary Joseph and Mike Nicholson. The subject of the film is British singer/songwriter Billy Franks (former frontman for the London 1980s band The Faith Brothers).

The film follows the real life, five-country trek that McCleery, Joseph and Nicholson took, along with Franks as they tried to track down ten famous singers (Huey Lewis, Bruce Springsteen, Elvis Costello, Steve Earle, Aaron Neville, Rod Stewart, Tom Petty, Jon Bon Jovi, Bryan Adams and Paul McCartney) and ask them if they each would be willing to record a track for a tribute album to the mostly unknown Franks, a fellow songwriter who has given his life to his craft but is still an unknown. All proceeds from the album being earmarked for the UK music charity Youth Music.

Although the film is mostly a comedy road trip it also explores the deeper issues of the arbitrary nature of celebrity, the lifelong pursuit of dreams and just how important friendships can be.

Awards
The film won "Best Music documentary" at the 2008 Bare Bones Film Festival.

References

External links
 
 

2008 films
American documentary films
Rockumentaries
2000s English-language films
2000s American films